Smudge is a 1922 American silent comedy-drama film produced and directed by Charles Ray. It starred Ray and Ora Carew.

cast
Charles Ray as Stephen Stanton
Charles K. French as John Stanton
Florence Oberle as Mrs. Clement
Ora Carew as Marie Clement
J. P. Lockney as Purdy
Blanche Rose as Mrs. Purdy
Lloyd Bacon as McGuire
Ralph McCullough as Regan

Preservation
Smudge is preserved at the Library of Congress and the Wisconsin Center for Film and Theater Research.

References

External links

1922 films
American silent feature films
First National Pictures films
1922 comedy-drama films
1920s English-language films
American black-and-white films
Films directed by Charles Ray
1920s American films
Silent American comedy-drama films